Sara Eriksson (born 1981) is a Swedish handball player. She plays for the club HC Leipzig and for the Swedish national team. She participated at the 2008 Summer Olympics in China, where the Swedish team placed eighth.

References

External links

1981 births
Living people
Swedish female handball players
Handball players at the 2008 Summer Olympics
Olympic handball players of Sweden
21st-century Swedish women